Oechlitz is a village and a former municipality in the district Saalekreis, in Saxony-Anhalt, Germany. Since 1 January 2010, it is part of the town Mücheln. It is located in the federal state of Saxony-Anhalt, in the central part of the country, 180 km southwest of Berlin 

Former municipalities in Saxony-Anhalt
Saalekreis